Slack Bay is a 2016 French comedy film directed by Bruno Dumont. It was selected to compete for the Palme d'Or at the 2016 Cannes Film Festival. Set on the north-west coast of France in the summer of 1910, with black humour and moments of absurdity the film depicts a confrontation between two families in the midst of a police hunt for missing persons.

Plot
The van Peteghems, rich and inbred industrialists, are visiting their summer mansion above the bay. On the other side of the creek are the Bruforts, fisherfolk with an unusual diet who also ferry people across the bay. The police are investigating because several visitors to the bay have never returned.

The eldest son of the Bruforts, called Ma Loute, falls in love with Billie, the eldest van Peteghem girl. When he discovers she has male organs, in disgust he takes her to the family farm where they store their meat. There she is kept with her mother and uncle, also destined for the cooking pot. With three of the influential van Peteghems missing, the police call in the army. Ma Loute, maybe with some scruples, dumps the three captives in the dunes, where they are found and rejoin their family.

Ma Loute finds happiness with the van Petteghem's maid, who is working class and wholly female. The unfortunate Billie faces an uncertain future.

Cast
 Fabrice Luchini as André van Peteghem
 Juliette Binoche as Aude van Peteghem, André's sister
 Valeria Bruni Tedeschi as Isabelle van Peteghem, André's wife and cousin
 Jean-Luc Vincent as Christian van Peteghem, Isabelle's brother and André's cousin
 Brandon Lavieville as Ma Loute Brufort
 Raph as Billie van Peteghem, Aude's incestuous daughter 
 Didier Després as Detective Inspector Machin
 Cyril Rigaux 	as Detective Malfoy

References

External links
 

2016 films
2016 comedy films
French comedy films
2010s French-language films
Films directed by Bruno Dumont
Films set in France
Films set in 1910
2010s French films